The 1937 New Jersey gubernatorial election was held on November 2, 1937. Democratic nominee A. Harry Moore defeated Republican nominee Lester H. Clee with 50.84% of the vote.

Primary elections
Primary elections were held on September 21, 1937.

Democratic primary

Candidates
A. Harry Moore, United States Senator and former Governor

Results

Republican primary

Candidates
Lester H. Clee, State Senator from Essex County and former Speaker of the Assembly
Clifford Ross Powell, State Senator from Burlington County and former Senate President (1934–35)

Results

General election

Candidates
Major party candidates
A. Harry Moore, Democratic
Lester H. Clee, Republican

Other candidates
James F. Murray, Sr., Anti-Hague Independent Labor
Eugene A. Smith, National Prohibition 
Henry Jager, Socialist Party of America
Frank Chandler, Communist Party USA
John T. Kurzowski, Independent
Dinshah P. Ghadiali, Independent
John C. Butterworth, Socialist Labor Party of America

Results

References

1937
New Jersey
1937 New Jersey elections
November 1937 events